Okpa (pronounced Ọkpa) is a delicacy prepared by the Igbo people with a special type of beans known as Bambara nuts. It is common in Enugu state and classified as a traditional Nigerian delicacy due to its uniqueness. Not limited to Igbo people, other tribes take it with pap or eat it alone. Other Igbo name for Okpa include ịgba and Ntucha. It is known as Gurjiya or kwaruru in hausa language.

Its main ingredient include; Bambara nut flour, palm oil, crayfish, salt and seasoning. Nutritionally, okpa has approximately 16.92% crude protein, 4.93% fat, 26.62% carbohydrate and 216.28 kcal energy value, making it one of the most balanced staples.

Preparation of Okpa 
Here are ways to prepare Okpa:

 Wash and salt the banana/plantain leaf used to wrap Okpa.
 Prepare a mixture of Okpa flour, ground crayfish, salt and seasoning in a large bowl, add reasonable quantity of palm oil, mix with spatula and mould until you achieve a yellow-red colour.
 Add lukewarm water into the mixture as well as blended pepper, then stir with a wooden spatula until smooth.
 Wrap the mixture into the leaf or a small polythene bag.
 After boiling water in a pot, place the wrapped Okpa and allow to steam for at least an hour. The okpa will be solid when fully cooked.
 Serve hot with custard, oatmeal, or pap.

Gallery

See also
 Nigerian cuisine
 Bambara groundnut
 Moin-moin

References 

Igbo cuisine
Nigerian cuisine
Puddings
Steamed foods
Africa